The Leeward Islands are one of the regions which make up the West Indies cricket team. It has produced international cricketers in all forms of the game—Tests, One Day Internationals (ODIs) and Twenty20 Internationals (T20Is). In cricketing terms the Leeward Islands are made up from the following nations and territories: Antigua and Barbuda, Saint Kitts and Nevis, Anguilla, Montserrat, British Virgin Islands, U.S. Virgin Islands and Sint Maarten. Four Leeward Islanders have captained the West Indies, the Antiguan Viv Richards has made the most Test appearances as captain, leading the side on 50 occasions.

The Nevisian Elquemedo Willett became the first Leeward Islander to represent the West Indies when he played against Australia in 1973, making the first of his 5 Test appearances. Richards has scored more Test and ODI runs than any other Leeward Islander and is the third highest West Indian run scorer in Test matches. Richie Richardson is the next highest in both forms of the game. Curtly Ambrose, also an Antiguan, has taken the most wickets of any Leeward Islander in Tests and ODIs. Andy Roberts has taken 202 wickets, the second highest of any Leeward Islander in tests. Viv Richards and Winston Benjamin are also the only other Leeward Islanders with 100 or more wickets in one day internationals.

Key
 Apps denotes the number of appearances the player has made.
 Runs denotes the number of runs scored by the player.
 Wkts denotes the number of wickets taken by the player.

Statistics correct as of: October 2022

See also
List of West Indies Test cricketers
List of West Indies ODI cricketers
List of West Indies Twenty20 International cricketers

References

International cricketers from Leeward Islands

International cricketers from Leeward Islands